Andirpar is a village in Kachua Upazila of Chandpur District in the Chittagong Division of eastern Bangladesh.

References

Populated places in Noakhali District